Oleksin may refer to the following places:
Oleksin, Otwock County in Masovian Voivodeship (east-central Poland)
Oleksin, Siedlce County in Masovian Voivodeship (east-central Poland)
Oleksin, Podlaskie Voivodeship (north-east Poland)